WTVR-FM (98.1 MHz) is a radio station licensed to Richmond, Virginia. WTVR-FM serves Central Virginia with an adult contemporary music format. The station is owned and operated by Audacy, Inc. with studios and offices located north of Richmond's city limits on Basie Road in Dumbarton.  It formerly shared a nearby broadcasting tower with its former TV sister station, WTVR-TV. (WTVR-TV no longer broadcasts from this tower.) Currently, it shares a tower with PBS member stations WCVE-TV and WCVW.

WTVR-FM is a grandfathered "superpower station". The station has an effective radiated power of 50,000 watts at 256 meters. This exceeds the maximum allowable ERP for the station's antenna height above average terrain according to current FCC rules, which is 17,500 watts at 256 meters.

History
WTVR-FM began broadcasting in February 1947 as WCOD (standing for "Capital Old Dominion") and was owned by the Richmond Broadcasting Company. It was the sister station of AM 1380, which is today WBTK. For many years, it was also co-owned with WTVR-TV. The call letters for all three stations were WTVR, signifying "Television Richmond." WTVR-FM operates at 50,000 watts, standard for most FM stations in the Richmond market.

For much of its early history, WTVR-FM aired beautiful music, although by the 1980s, that mostly instrumental format was falling out of favor with younger listeners. 

At its original on site with WTVR-TV Main Street studios at 3314 Cutshaw avenue in downtown Richmond, Virginia, one could see its amazing free standing Broadcast tower for miles around. The TV and AM/FM radio stations, shared a parking lot at that time with the radio studios across the parking lot, in the house on Cutshaw avenue, situated behind the TV station.

During the Stereo Country FM98 mid 1980s era, the WTVR-FM had a live personality line up, and was simulcasting their live country format with its 1380 AM counterpart. In the mid 1980s it competed with small 3,000 watt class A facility WKHK-FM 95.3 nearby but they were always second banana to WTVR-FM having a 50,000 watt class B signal, and better personalities. In their Stereo Country FM98 era, at the helm was program director Mike Allen who did weekday morning drive 5:30am to 10am, followed by Hillary Kane on middays 10am-3pm, Dave Shannon in afternoon drive from 3pm-7pm, and then the stations assist automation system took over from 7pm to 5:30am with only recorded carted weather during breaks. The facility was owned by Roy H. Park in this era. Eventually the station  moved away from their country format, and gradually added more soft vocals to its playlist, transitioning to the adult contemporary format heard today. 

On November 13, 2015, WTVR-FM switched to Christmas music, and began calling itself "The All-New Christmas 98.1." In recent years, along with many other adult contemporary radio stations, WTVR-FM switches to all holiday music from mid-November to Christmas Day. As the holidays ended, iHeartMedia rebranded the station as "Mix 98.1" on December 28.  Despite the new branding, the format remains adult contemporary, although more uptempo.

On November 1, 2017, iHeartMedia announced that WTVR-FM, along with all of their sister stations in Richmond and Chattanooga, would be sold to Entercom (now Audacy, Inc.) as part of that company's merger with CBS Radio. The sale was completed on December 19, 2017.

WTVR-HD2
WTVR-FM broadcasts a simulcast of news/talk-formatted WRVA on its HD2 sub channel. On May 5, 2014, translator W253BI (98.5 FM) began simulcasting WRVA via WTVR-HD2.  The simulcast on W253BI ended on July 23, 2015; WRVA's signal is still relayed via WTVR-HD2.

References

External links

TVR-FM
Mainstream adult contemporary radio stations in the United States
Radio stations established in 1946
1946 establishments in Virginia
Audacy, Inc. radio stations